Dalsfjorden may refer to:

 Dalsfjorden (Sunnmøre), a fjord in Volda Municipality in Møre og Romsdal county, Norway
 Dalsfjorden (Sunnfjord), a fjord in Sogn og Fjordane county, Norway